Edward Janssens (born 18 January 1946) is a Belgian former racing cyclist. He rode in seven editions of the Tour de France, as well as three of the Giro d'Italia, and the Vuelta a España.

Major results
1971
 1st GP Briek Schotte
 2nd Grote Prijs Stad Zottegem
 3rd Grote Prijs Jef Scherens
 3rd GP Flandria
 7th Ronde van Brabant
1972
 5th Overall Tour of Belgium
1973
 1st Stage 4 Tour of Belgium
1975
 1st Leeuwse Pijl
 8th Overall Tour de Suisse
 9th Overall Tour de France

References

External links
 

1946 births
Living people
Belgian male cyclists
20th-century Belgian people